Megachile trisecta is a species of bee in the family Megachilidae. It was described by Pasteels in 1976.

References

Trisecta
Insects described in 1976